A contract of carriage is a contract between a carrier of cargo or passengers and the consignor, consignee or passenger. Among common carriers, they are usually evidenced by standard terms and conditions printed on the reverse of a ticket or carriage document. Notification of a shipment’s arrival is usually sent to the "notify party", whose address appears on the shipping document. This party is usually either the buyer or the importer.

Air travel
In July 2010, it became widely public that Southwest Airlines had classified mechanical difficulties as an act of God in their contract of carriage, expanding the definition formerly shared with Delta, American, Continental and United. This was later clarified by the airline as mechanical difficulties beyond the airline's control, as for instance the failure of the air traffic control system, or fuel delivery systems operated by airports.

Involuntary denied boarding

Airlines may sell more tickets for a flight than the number of seats that are actually available. This overselling can result in too many passengers turning up for a flight. When this happens, the airline first asks for volunteers to give up their seat in return for compensation. However, if there are not enough volunteers, the airline itself designates which passengers will have to give up their seats. This process is called involuntary denied boarding or (less formally) bumping.

The rate of passengers who are involuntarily denied boarding is around 1 in 10,000 and has been falling for the 25 years between 1990 and 2015.

According to aviation analyst Henry Harteveldt, the airline's contract of carriage favors the company, not the passenger. Involuntary denial of boarding is not uncommon but removal after boarding because the seat is needed by others is "exceedingly rare". Nonetheless, an airline has a right to do so based on the contract, in his view. "Remember, it is their aircraft and their seat — you're just renting it to get from point A to point B," Harteveldt told Business Insider.

Rail travel
Cross-border European railway tickets are covered by the CIV conditions of sale.

References

External links
Airline contracts
 Contract of Carriage, Hawaiian Airlines. Viewed 23 December 2012.
 Contract of Carriage, Alaska Airlines. Viewed 11 April 2008.
 Terms and conditions, FedEx. Viewed 3 April 2006.

Public transport fare collection
Freight transport
Transport law
Contract law
Terms of service